Dresscode was a Finnish fashion TV-series airing on MoonTV. It was hosted by master tailor Arman Alizad. The series run for three seasons, from 2001 to 2003.

Synopsis 

Dresscode took a very diverse approach to fashion, and was considered by many to be more of a lifestyle-show. It covered very varied subjects like clothing, jewelry, interior design, etiquette, food, drinks, cars, and even guns.

Cast and Characters 

The series was hosted by Arman Alizad, a Finnish master tailor, who also developed several alter egos for the show. Alizad was sometimes co-hosted by Teresa Ackalin. Alizad later became internationally famous for the martial arts series Kill Arman.

Production 

The series was directed by Tuukka Tiensuu and produced by Vera Olsson. It was an in-house production for MoonTV.

External links 
 A newspaper report on Dresscode 
 Dresscode host Arman Alizad interviewed 

2001 Finnish television series debuts
Finnish television shows
2000s Finnish television series